The 1932–33 SK Rapid Wien season was the 35th season in club history.

Squad

Squad and statistics

Fixtures and results

League

Cup

References

1932-33 Rapid Wien Season
Rapid